Frank Edward McGurrin (April 2, 1861 – August 17, 1933) invented touch typing in 1888. He was a court stenographer at Salt Lake City who taught typing classes. He taught himself to touch type without looking at the keys, before challenging and winning a competition.

History
On July 25, 1888, McGurrin, who was purportedly the only person using touch typing at the time, won a decisive victory over Louis Traub (operating Caligraph with eight-finger method) in a typing contest held in Cincinnati. The results were displayed on the front pages of many newspapers. McGurrin won $500 (worth $10,820 in 2006) and popularized the new typing method.

Whether McGurrin was actually the first person to touch type, or simply the first to be popularly noticed, is disputed.  Speeds attained by other typists in other typing competitions at the time suggest that they must have been using similar systems.

The first touch operator
The following story of how McGurrin came to operate the typewriter by "touch" is told in his own words:

Corbitt's effort "to take the conceit out of" McGurrin resulted in the development of an operator who was the first to demonstrate that "touch" typewriting was not an unattainable ideal, but could actually be accomplished with a saving of time and labor. This new achievement in typewriter operating immediately attracted wide attention. Theodore C. Rose, Vice-President of the International Convention of Shorthand Writers, at the meeting at Chicago on September 1, 1881, made the following reference to McGurrin's work:
"I would say that in the past week I was in the office of Walsh & Ford, in Grand Rapids, and that a young man in their office, on a test, wrote ninety-seven words on the type-writer, and read the copy. He did not look at the machine, at all, but kept his eye on the copy. I know he wrote ninety-seven words in a minute, because I held the watch."
This utterance is also notable because it is probably the first reference to what we now know as the "touch system" contained in the reports of any of the conventions.

References

Typing
People from Grand Rapids, Michigan
1933 deaths
1861 births